Tambopata Province is the largest of three provinces in the Madre de Dios Region of Peru.

Political division
The province is divided into four districts, which are:

 Inambari
 Laberinto
 Las Piedras
 Tambopata

Representation
This province has one communal representative to the regional government.

See also 
Tambopata National Reserve
 Sach'awakayuq

Provinces of the Madre de Dios Region